Nixa High School is a public high school in Nixa, Missouri, United States. Nixa High School received the National Blue Ribbon in 2013 and 2022. It is ranked number thirty in the state and first in the Springfield metropolitan area by U.S. News & World Report in 2022.

History
The first Nixa High School was established in 1908 and was a one-room schoolhouse. In 2000, the high school moved from the present day Nixa Junior High, (on Main Street), the new high school (on Nicholas Road).

In January 2022, Nixa High School officials reported that several soap dispensers had to be removed from the school's bathrooms after some students took them apart and urinated inside of them, and that they believed these actions were part of a TikTok challenge.

Extracurricular activities

Athletics

Overview 
Nixa High School has Football, Softball, Volleyball, Basketball, Wrestling, Baseball, Track and Field, Golf, Swimming, Bowling, Cross Country, Soccer, Tennis, and Bass Fishing.

Football 
The Nixa football team consists of three teams: Freshman, JV, and Varsity. In 2014, Nixa went to the Class 5 Football State Championship, but fell short by 3 points in a 25–22 loss to Battle High School. In early 2020, longtime coach Richard Rehagen retired as Nixa's football coach. Nixa hired John Perry; a coach from Mississippi who won state in 2016, as the new coach for the football team.

Volleyball

The Nixa Lady Eagles Volleyball team won the Class 4 State Championship against Lafayette in 2019, and got second place in the Class 5 State Championship against Liberty North in 2020.

Girls and Boys Basketball

Boys Basketball won state in 1978 and 1999 while Girls Basketball won state in 2000 and 2009.

Wrestling

Nixa has had numerous wrestlers win state over the years.

Marching Band 
The marching band marches in local, regional and national competitions. The marching shows are as follows: Into the Storm (1999), Full Circle (2004), R.E.M. (2005), Pulse (2006), Vertigo (2007), At Dawn They Slept (2008), A Brand New World (2009), ESCAPE (2010), Juxtapose (2011),  Wolf (2012), Room 218: Night at the Crescent Hotel: (2013), SUPER (2014), CONNECT (2015), Goodnight Moon (2016), JOY (2017), Birds of a Feather (2018), Thorns Remain (2019), Up and Away (2020), Kaleido: A Scope of Glass and Light (2021), This Winter’s Night (2022)

The band also marches in local parades, including the Nixa Christmas Parade, and Nixa Sucker Days Festival.

Concert Bands 
During the spring semester, the 220+ Nixa High School band divides into three concert large ensembles including Concert Band, Symphonic Band, and Wind Ensemble, and several smaller ensembles, including Percussion, and Jazz ensembles.

Theater 
The Nixa Theater department performs two musicals per year.

FFA

In 2021, Nixa High School brought the FFA back to the school.

Notable alumni

References

External links
 

Public high schools in Missouri
Christian County, Missouri
1908 establishments in Missouri
Educational institutions established in 1908